Pyhäjärvi (1993–1995 Pyhäsalmi) is a town and municipality in the south of Northern Ostrobothnia region, Finland. Pyhäjärvi also borders the Northern Savonia and Central Finland regions. The town belongs to the subregion of Nivala–Haapajärvi. Its seat is in Pyhäsalmi.

Neighbouring municipalities are Haapajärvi, Kiuruvesi, Kärsämäki, Pielavesi, Pihtipudas and Pyhäntä. As the highway 4 (E75), the highway 27 and the Ylivieska–Iisalmi railway all run through the town, Pyhäjärvi is well situated in an intersection of communication and transport services. The town has also an airfield.

Pyhäjärvi became officially a town in January 1993. The town has  inhabitants, of whom some 60 percent live in the two population centres Pyhäsalmi and Ruotanen. It is the second smallest town of Finland in term of population after Kaskinen in the Ostrobothnia region.

Underground mining was due to end in 2019, but has been granted approximately 14 months more of mining activity due to an increase in demand for pyrite from Yara in Siilinjärvi. The on-surface refinery will be operational until 2025. The mine facilities and the associated infrastructure will be used for underground business and research under the Callio Pyhäsalmi project.

See also
 Outokumpu, Finland
 Siilinjärvi

References

External links

 
 Town of Pyhäjärvi – Official website

 
Cities and towns in Finland
Mining towns in Finland
Populated places established in 1866
1866 establishments in the Russian Empire
Populated lakeshore places in Finland